Saqib Ali Zahid, more commonly known by his online alias, Lirik, is an American streamer. He has among the largest followings on Twitch with over 2.9 million followers in 2022. Zahid is sponsored by Discord and is one of 200 influencers the company pays for promotion.

Career
Zahid began streaming on Twitch in 2011. He initially played World of Warcraft, but switched to DayZ after the game was released. He focused on regular streaming in 2012. His following eventually grew to averages of 20,000 to 40,000 viewers per stream.

In 2016, Zahid was interviewed by PCGamesN regarding the future of "streams and how the service will evolve".

In 2017, Zahid began streaming PlayerUnknown's Battlegrounds, but later complained that the game was "riddled with bugs" and "stale". Zahid was invited to the PUBG Winter Charity Invitational where $200,000 was set to be donated to the selected charities of the top three teams. He has been listed as the fifth most successful streamer, earning over $200,000 from subscribers in 2017.

In January 2018, Zahid announced he was taking a short break from streaming due to stress and feeling "burnt out". He returned a week later.

In 2019, Lirik announced he would stay with Twitch and not go to Mixer following an exodus of streamers. In December he signed a multi-year contract with Twitch.

Personal life
In August of 2022, Zahid alluded to him having to take off time for a "certain reason". Weeks later, it was revealed that Zahid and his wife had just had a baby girl, thus becoming the true "Gamer Dad".

See also 
 List of most-followed Twitch channels

References

External links

American esports players
Living people
World of Warcraft players
Twitch (service) streamers
Year of birth missing (living people)